Fremantle Port Authority, also known by its registered business name Fremantle Ports, is the responsible authority created under the Western Australian Port Authorities Act 1999.

Harbour administration
In August 1829 the Fremantle Harbour Master position was created and the first incumbent was Captain Mark John Currie, serving for three years before leaving the colony in 1832. He was succeeded by Daniel Scott, who served for eighteen years as harbourmaster until he resigned in 1850. Captain James Harding was appointed acting harbourmaster of Fremantle, upon the resignation of Scott and the position was confirmed in 1852. Harding drowned in June 1867 attempting to assist a sinking vessel, Strathmore, near Garden Island. Following Harding's death Captain George J. Butcher was acting harbourmaster. The position was filled in 1868 by Lieutenant James Nias Croke, who served until 1874. He was replaced by Captain George Forsyth. In January 1880 as a result of the formation of the Harbour and Light Department, the position of Chief Harbour Master of the Colony of Western Australia was created, with Forsyth, the serving Fremantle harbor master taking on the position, until he was dismissed in 1886. Charles Russell was then appointed as Chief Harbour Master, serving until 1902.

Fremantle Harbour Trust
In 1903 Fremantle Harbour Trust was created with five commissioners, three commissioners to be appointed by the Governor with the remaining two positions appointed by the Fremantle Chamber of Commerce and the Perth Chamber of Commerce respectively, chairman of the Trust was then appointed by the Governor. The first formal meeting of the Fremantle Harbour Trust commissioners occurred on 5 January 1903 in the Dalgety Building, the original board of commissioners were R. Laurie (chairman), C. Hudson, William Sandover, A. Leeds, and T. Coombe. At that time resident Engineer of Harbour works was W. Leslie and harbour master was Captain Charles James Irvine, both of whom were present for the meeting.

Fremantle Port Authority
The Fremantle Harbour Trust ceased in November 1964, and was replaced by the Fremantle Port Authority.

Events 
Fremantle Ports in collaboration with the Fremantle City Council and other bodies holds an annual Fremantle maritime day.

Harbourmasters

References

Fremantle Harbour
Port authorities in Australia
Statutory agencies of Western Australia